The Classica-class cruise ship is a class of cruise ships originally built for and operated by Costa Cruises. They were built prior to Carnival Corporation & plc purchasing the cruise line in 1997. The first ship was built in 1991 as the Costa Classica. It was followed by a sister ship named the Costa Romantica in 1993. Both ships were operated by Costa for over 20 years. As of 2021 both ships have since left the fleet. The oldest vessel is still in service while the newer vessel has since been sold for scrap.

Ships

References

Cruise ship classes